Shrum Mound is a Native American burial mound in Campbell Memorial Park in Columbus, Ohio. The mound was created around 2,000 years ago by the Pre-Columbian Native American Adena culture. The site was added to the National Register of Historic Places in 1970.

Shrum Mound is named after the family whose farm once included the land on which the mound is located. Ohio History Connection is the current owner of the mound after receiving the property as a donation from the late Ohio governor James E. Campbell. Shrum Mound is located within Campbell Park, which is named after James E. Campbell.

In 2015, the Ohio History Connection removed the 18 or so trees located on top of the mound, citing preservation as the reason. One concern was the possibility of a strong storm knocking down a tree and causing damage to the mound.

Gallery

See also

 List of parks in Columbus, Ohio

References

External links 

Adena culture
Archaeological sites in Ohio
Mounds in Ohio
Parks in Columbus, Ohio
History of Columbus, Ohio